and  are two Arabic titles derived from the same triliteral root Ḥ-K-M "appoint, choose, judge".

Hakīm
This title is one of the 99 Names of God in Islam.

Hakīm (alternative transcription Hakeem) indicates a "wise man" or "physician", or in general, a practitioner of herbal medicine, especially of Unani and Islamic medicine, like Hakim Ajmal Khan, Hakim Said, Hakim Syed Zillur Rahman, etc.

Hakīm or Hakeem is also used for practitioner of Eastern medicine, those versed in indigenous system of medicines.

Hakīm was also used more generally during the Islamic Golden Age to refer to polymath scholars who were knowledgeable in religion, medicine, the sciences, and Islamic philosophy.

Some examples of hakīm are:

 Ibn Sina
 Omar Khayyam

Uses
 In old Abyssinia or Ethiopia,  Hakim usually meant a learned person, usually a physician. Hence a Hakim-Bejt was a doctor's house or hospital.
 In Bangladesh, India and Pakistan, Hakim or Hakeem denotes a herbal medicine practitioner, specially of Unani medicine.
 In Turkey, hekim denotes a physician, while hakim can be used for a very wise person or philosopher. (See also the use of the homonymous word hakim for a judge, mentioned below.)

Hākim
Hākim (alternative transcription Hakem) means a ruler, governor or judge.  As with many titles, it also occurs as a part of the names of many individuals.

In Arab countries
 In three future Persian Gulf emirates, the first monarchic style was :
Since then the style has officially been  ('Emir of the State of Kuwait');
From 1871, they were also styked , Ottoman district administrator, as with Kuwait above, until 3 November 1916, thereafter under British protectorate. Since independence from Britain on 3 September 1971, the style has been  ('Emir of the State of Qatar').
 In Libya, Hakim was the 1946 – 12 February 1950 style of the "ruler" of the former sultanate of Fezzan during the UN administration (in practice by France, with its own concurrent military governor); the only incumbent, Ahmad Sayf an-Nasr (born , died 1954), stayed on as regional wali (governor; in French  'head of the territory') in the united Libyan kingdom until 24 December 1951, with a French Resident at his side, and then, without such French shadow, as first royal governor (until 1954).
 In Yemen until 1902 (changed to Sultan) the rulers of the Quaiti State of Shir and Mukalla, ash-Shihr Wa´l Mukalla, as before the 10 November 1881 merger with the Naqib of Mukalla's state it has been the princely style of ash-Shihr since independence from the Ottomans in 1866.

Elsewhere
 In the Makran region of Sistan and Baluchestan Province in Iran, hakom refers to sardars and khans in the traditional Baluchi government.
 In Indonesia, Malaysia and Turkey, hakim denotes a judge.
 In Nepal, a Bada Hakim was in charge of a district of the realm.
 In the Emirate of Bukhara, hakem was the title of a governor.
 In Nigeria, the Sokoto Caliphate is ceremonially governed by hakimai (sing. "hakimi"), chiefs that are answerable to the Sultan of Sokoto and the Emirs of the realm.
 In Uzbekistan, the term hokim is used to describe a governor or mayor of a region.
 In Kazakhstan, the term äkim is used to describe local-level mayors or governors of regions within the country.

Furthermore
As with many titles, the word also occurs in many personal names, without any noble or political significance.

See also
Sharif

References

Gubernatorial titles
Heads of government
Heads of state
Titles of national or ethnic leadership
Arabic honorifics
Unani medicine
Islamic honorifics